The 1942 Ohio Bobcats football team was an American football team that represented Ohio University as an independent during the 1942 college football season. In their 19th season under head coach Don Peden, the Bobcats compiled a 5–3 record and outscored opponents by a total of 144 to 107.

Schedule

References

Ohio
Ohio Bobcats football seasons
Ohio Bobcats football